The Life of Sir William Petty 1623-1687 is a book, written by Lord Edmond Fitzmaurice, and published in 1895.  It is a biography of Sir William Petty, the 17th-century scientist, known for his inventions, his charting of large parts of Ireland, in the Down Survey, and his publications on many different topics, like "political arithmetic" and political economy.

Bibliographical information 
 
335 p.

Fitzmaurice founded his biography of Sir William Petty largely on the manuscripts in the so-called 'Bowood' papers. The papers originally belonging to Sir William Petty passed to his grandson, John Petty, 1st Earl of Shelburne (1706-1761), who bought Bowood House in Wiltshire, England in 1754.

The letters written by Sir William Petty to Sir Robert Southwell (1635-1702) were later added to the Bowood papers by the 3rd Marquis of Lansdowne.

Apart from the Bowood papers, Fitzmaurice also studied manuscripts in the British Museum, in the Bodleian Library and in the Library of Trinity College, Dublin.

The biographer: Lord Edmond Fitzmaurice 
Lord Edmond Fitzmaurice (1846-1935), also named Edmond George Petty-Fitzmaurice, was a descendant of William Petty and a liberal politician. He also published a biography of his great-grandfather, William Petty, 2nd Earl of Shelburne in 1912, biographies of Granville Leveson-Gower, 2nd Earl Granville (in 1905) and of Charles William Ferdinand, Duke of Brunswick-Wolfenbüttel (in 1901), and some theatre plays.

The biography 
The biography is chronological. In the first chapter the life of Petty up to 1652 is summarized. It ends with his application as surgery-general in Cromwell's Irish army.

In the second and third chapter, which cover a total of 80 pages, an extensive description is given of the Down Survey, the cadastral survey carried out by Petty in 1655 and 1656, and especially on the long aftermath of that survey. After the survey Petty was accused of fraud and bribery, and it took him years to clear his name.

The next chapters cover the period from 1660 to 1678, in which Petty published much of the works that, centuries later, brought him fame among economists and statisticians. A separate, central chapter (Chapter 7) is devoted to his "Political Arithmetic" (and his opinions concerning political economy).

The last three chapters give an overview of the period from 1678 until Petty's death in 1687.

Critical reception 
The Life of Petty was reviewed in different journals.

 wrote a review in Die Neue Zeit, 1896.
He was happy to see that a biography on William Petty had appeared: 'Finally, more than two hundred years after his death, the most genial of the English political economists  of the seventeenth century has found his biographer', writes Cunow in his review in Die Neue Zeit in 1896. But, does he write subsequently, the (large amount of) work that is done by Fitzmaurice, does not provide a satisfactory result and does not offer a clear image of the character (of Petty). Questions like 'what where the influences that worked on Petty's intellectual development?' are not answered and only on very few places insight is given into the depth of Petty's ideas ('Ideenwelt'). Neither gives Fitzmaurice an account of the less attractive sides of Petty's character, like his ruthless addiction to profitmaking.

Cunow also makes some remarks concerning Bevan's Sir William Petty: A Study in English Economic Literature (1894).

Hull finds a sharp distinction between the first six chapters (1623-1678) and the last chapters. In the first chapters Fitzmaurice "writes chiefly from sources already well known (…).. Relatively little that is new appears." Whereas the latter part of the book is largely based on (until then less known) Petty's correspondence with Sir Robert Southwell (1635-1702) and on several unprinted letters to Lady Petty.

 wrote a review in The American Historical Review, 1895. He thought that a reader will profit of this book, full of information, and giving abundant means of arriving at a fair estimate of Petty's character, "only in proportion to what he already knows of the period; and even those who have some tolerable acquaintance with the time will find themselves at a loss to explain many of the allusions with which Petty's papers are bestrewn. The note on pages 296, 301,–"the allusion is not clear,"–might stand with equal propriety at the foot of many other pages."

References

Bibliography 
  (see also: this page (visited 2018-08-27).)

 
 
  (also includes a review of )

1895 non-fiction books
Books about William Petty